A Wen Wu temple or Wenwu temple is a dual temple in China venerating the two patron gods of civil and martial affairs in the same temple complex. In southern China the civil god or Wéndì is Wenchang, while in the north it is Confucius; in both north and south the martial god or Wǔdì is Lord Guan. Although single temples to either the civil or martial god alone are widespread, it is comparatively rare to find temples venerating both. During the Ming and Qing dynasties, Wen Wu temples were patronised by those seeking success in the Imperial examinations, which were divided into civil and military examinations, and by those seeking advancement in professions which could be interpreted as falling under the aegis of one of the gods. Thus, to the present day, civil servants make offerings to the civil god, and policemen to the martial god.

Examples of Wen Wu temples

Mainland China
Danleng Weng Wu Temple, in Meishan Sichuan, constructed during the Yongxi period (984—987 CE) of the reign of Emperor Taizong of Song, reconstructed during the reign of the Jiajing Emperor (1522-1566) during the Ming Dynasty and  expanded in the seventh year (1827 CE) of the Daoguang Emperor of Qing. The temple is said to be the alma mater of Su Shi.

Hong Kong
There are temples in 
Sheung Wan
Tai Po
Pak Ngan Heung, Mui Wo, Lantau Island

Taiwan
In Taiwan there are Wen Wu temples in 
 Lukang, Changhua, Lukang Wen Wu Temple
 Sun Moon Lake, the Sun Moon Lake Wen Wu Temple was built after rising water levels from building a dam forced several smaller temples to be removed. 
 New Taipei City

See also
Temple of Confucius
Martial temple
State Temple of the Martial God
Hip Tin temples in Hong Kong 
Kwan Tai temples in Hong Kong

References

External links

Folk religious temples in China
Imperial examination
Miao shrines